The Inventory Stela (also known as Stela of Khufu's Daughter) is an ancient Egyptian commemorative tablet dating to the 26th Dynasty (c. 670 BC). It was found in Giza during the 19th century. The stela presents a list of 22 divine statues owned by a Temple of Isis, and goes on to claim that the temple existed since before the time of Khufu (c. 2580 BC).

Discovery 
The stela was discovered in 1858 at Giza by the French archaeologist Auguste Mariette, during excavations of the Isis temple, next to queen's pyramid G1-c. The tablet was found close to the Great Sphinx of Giza.

Description 
The original size of the tablet is unknown, since it was already damaged at the time of its discovery. The creation of the stela can be dated back to the 26th Dynasty, the Saite period, around 670 BC. The Inventory Stela is made of limestone and decorated with a commemorative inscription and a so-called apparition window. The apparition window names 22 divine statues of different deities, the statues are claimed to have been part of the temple's belongings. The statues are figuratively depicted and their material and size are also described.

The commemorative text is engraved on the U-shaped frame around the apparition window. It praises the gods Isis, Mistress of the pyramids and Osiris, Lord of Rosta. After this, the inscription claims that the Isis temple was already at its place before the pyramids had been erected and that the temple was discovered by Khufu east of the Great Pyramid, beside the "house of Harmakhis" (the Sphinx). Then it claims that Khufu first "built the temple of Isis anew" and then built a pyramid for the "king's daughter Henutsen". Finally, the goddess Isis is praised and again entitled as "mistress of the pyramids".

Historical importance 
The credibility of the Inventory Stela is viewed by historians and Egyptologists with great caution. The text contains many anachronisms and its elaboration is poor. To the scholars it is obvious that the stela was a purposeful fake, created by the local priests with the attempt to certify the Isis temple an ancient history it never had. Such an act became common when religious institutions such as temples, shrines and priests' domains where fighting for political attention and for financial and economic donations.

The Isis temple was built on the remains of the mortuary temple of queen's pyramid G1-c, which is today believed to be queen Henutsen's tomb. Already in ruins at the end of the Middle Kingdom, the mortuary temple was first rebuilt and enlarged in the Eighteenth Dynasty. Further reconstruction took place in the Twenty-first and Twenty-sixth Dynasty, when it served as a place of worship for the cult of Isis, Mistress of the Pyramid. 

A first, direct proof for fakery is the circumstance that Khufu is introduced by his Horus name first, not by his birth name inside a cartouche, as it was actually common at this time. Secondly, it mentions the goddess Isis. But Isis' name does not verifiably occur before king (pharaoh) Nyuser-Rê of the 5th Dynasty and she never had the title "mistress of the pyramid(s)". And, third of all, Henutsen was a queen consort, her actual parents are unknown and she is not known to be the daughter of a king.

Despite these scholarly conclusions, people who adhere to the hypothesis that the Great Sphinx and the pyramids are much older than Egyptologists want to believe, consider the stela as a proof supporting such claims.

References 

7th-century BC steles
1858 archaeological discoveries
Ancient Egyptian stelas
Pseudoarchaeology